Poetik-Professur an der Universität Bamberg is a literary prize of Germany. Annually since 1986, authors come to the University of Bamberg, at the invitation of the Chair of Modern German Literature Studies.

Poetics professor

 1986: Eugen Gomringer
 1987: Barbara Bronnen
 1987: not awarded
 1989: Lutz Rathenow
 1990: not awarded
 1991: Tankred Dorst
 1992: Ingomar von Kieseritzky
 1993: Gerhard Köpf
 1994: Giwi Margwelaschwili
 1995: Hans Joachim Schädlich
 1996: Zsuzsanna Gahse
 1997: Gerhard C. Krischker
 1998: Michael Krüger
 1999: Doris Runge
 2000: Marcel Beyer
 2001: Jan Koneffke
 2002: Hans Wollschläger
 2003: Adolf Muschg
 2004: Bernhard Setzwein
 2005: Uwe Timm
 2006: Ulrike Draesner
 2007: Hanns-Josef Ortheil
 2008: John von Düffel
 2009: Wilhelm Genazino
 2010: Robert Schindel
 2011: Annette Pehnt
 2012: Thomas Glavinic
 2013: Jenny Erpenbeck
 2014: Peter Stamm
 2015: Lukas Bärfuss
 2016: Clemens J. Setz
 2017: Kathrin Röggla
 2018: Markus Orths
 2019: Michael Köhlmeier
 2020/21: Jan Wagner
 2021: Silke Scheuermann

References

External links
 

German literary awards